The 1989 Brisbane Rugby League season was the 68th season of semi-professional top level rugby league in Brisbane, Queensland, Australia.

Teams 

Source:

Final 
Fortitude Valley 28 (S. Buckley 2, M. Fiechtner 2, Z. Strasser tries; S. Hegarty 4 goals) defeated Ipswich 4 (S. Smith try) at Lang Park.

References 

Rugby league in Brisbane
Brisbane Rugby League season